Lamplighter is a young adult fantasy novel by D. M. Cornish, first published in 2006. It is the second in the Monster Blood Tattoo Series.

The book covers Rosamund's final weeks as a prentice-lighter, the internal politics of the Lamplighters, his first posting, court-martial and leaving the service.

2006 novels
Young adult fantasy novels
Australian young adult novels
Steampunk novels
Australian fantasy novels